Group A of the 2011 Copa América was one of the three groups of competing nations in the 2011 Copa América. It comprised Argentina, Bolivia, Colombia, and Costa Rica. Group play ran from 1 to 11 July 2011.

Colombia won the group and faced Peru, the best third-placed finishers, in the quarter-finals. Argentina finished second and faced Uruguay—the runners-up of Group C—in the quarter-finals. Costa Rica and Bolivia finished third and fourth in the group, respectively, and were eliminated from the tournament.

Standings

All times are in local, Argentina Time (UTC−03:00).

Argentina vs Bolivia

Colombia vs Costa Rica

Argentina vs Colombia

Bolivia vs Costa Rica

Colombia vs Bolivia

Argentina vs Costa Rica

External links
Copa América 2011 Official Site

Group A
2011 in Bolivian football
Group
2011–12 in Costa Rican football
2011 in Colombian football